Albert Edward Young (11 September 1917 – January 2013) was a Welsh footballer who played as a full-back in the English Football League for Swindon Town.

Career
Having spent the 1937–38 season at nursery club Margate, Young signed as a professional for Arsenal in 1938. In May 1939, he travelled with Arsenal on a tour of Belgium, Sweden and Denmark, but he failed to make any competitive appearances for the North London club due to the outbreak of the Second World War.

During the war, Young was stationed with the British Army in Northern Ireland, where he played for Glentoran and represented the Irish League in 1941. He also guested for Crystal Palace, Watford, Chelsea and Tottenham Hotspur.

Young signed for Swindon Town in the summer of 1946. However, he had made his debut for the Robins three months before his actual transfer from Arsenal, in the Southern Section Cup against Aldershot. His league debut for Swindon Town came on 31 August 1946 against Northampton Town in a 4–1 defeat at the County Ground, Northampton. His last appearance for the Robins came in the 1949–50 season on New Year's Eve 1949 away at Aldershot, in a 0–0 draw at the Recreation Ground. At the end of the season he then moved on to non-league Essex club Chelmsford City.

Club

References

External links

1917 births
2013 deaths
People from Caerleon
Footballers from Newport, Wales
Welsh footballers
Association football defenders
Margate F.C. players
Arsenal F.C. players
Swindon Town F.C. players
Chelmsford City F.C. players
English Football League players
British Army personnel of World War II
Glentoran F.C. players
Crystal Palace F.C. wartime guest players
Watford F.C. wartime guest players
Chelsea F.C. wartime guest players
Tottenham Hotspur F.C. wartime guest players